The Frauen DFB-Pokal 2003–04 was the 24th season of the cup competition, Germany's second-most important title in women's football. The first round of the competition was held on 6–7 September 2003. In the final which was held in Berlin on 29 May 2004 Turbine Potsdam defeated FFC Frankfurt 3–0, thus claiming their first title.

1st round

Heike Rheine's 20–0 victory against FC Oberneuland was the most lopsided result in the Frauen DFB-Pokal ever, tied with an FFC Frankfurt victory from the 2001–02 season.

2nd round

Quarter-finals

Semi-finals

Final

DFB-Pokal Frauen seasons
Pokal
Fra